
The following lists events that happened during 1832 in South Africa.

Events

Births
 30 September - Frederick Roberts, 1st Earl Roberts, commander of British troops in the Second Boer War, is born in Cawnpore, India

References
See Years in South Africa for list of References

 
South Africa
Years in South Africa